Dave Moylan (born August 13, 1967) is a Canadian retired professional ice hockey defenceman. He was drafted by the Buffalo Sabres in the fourth round (77th overall) of the 1985 NHL Entry Draft.

Moylan was selected first overall by the Sudbury Wolves in the 1984 Ontario Hockey League (OHL) Priority Selection and played major junior hockey in the OHL from 1984 to 1987 for the Sudbury Wolves and Kitchener Rangers. He won a silver medal with Team Canada at the 1986 World Junior Ice Hockey Championships.

During the 1989–90 season, while playing with Jokerit in the Finnish SM-liiga, Moylan led the league with 107 penalty minutes.

References

External links

Living people
1967 births
Amarillo Rattlers players
Brantford Smoke players
Buffalo Sabres draft picks
Canadian ice hockey defencemen
Flint Spirits players
Jokerit players
Kalamazoo Wings (ECHL) players
Kitchener Rangers players
New Haven Nighthawks players
Phoenix Roadrunners (IHL) players
Rochester Americans players
Sudbury Wolves players
Sportspeople from Tillsonburg
Ice hockey people from Ontario
Canadian expatriate ice hockey players in Finland